The Radio Club de Chile (RCCH) is a national non-profit organization for amateur radio enthusiasts in Chile.  Key membership benefits of RCCH include the sponsorship of amateur radio operating awards and radio contests, and a QSL bureau for those members who regularly communicate with amateur radio operators in other countries. RCCH represents the interests of Chilean amateur radio operators before Chilean and international telecommunications regulatory authorities.  RCCH is the national member society representing Chile in the International Amateur Radio Union.

See also 
International Amateur Radio Union

References 

Chile
Clubs and societies in Chile
Organizations established in 1922
1922 establishments in Chile
Radio in Chile
Organisations based in Santiago